Monkey Man is an upcoming American action thriller film written by Paul Angunawela, John Collee, and directed by Dev Patel, who serves as co-writer. The film stars Patel, Sharlto Copley, and Sobhita Dhulipala.

Monkey Man is scheduled to be released in 2023, by Netflix.

Premise
A recently released ex-felon living in India struggles to adjust to a world of corporate greed and eroding spiritual values.

Cast
 Dev Patel as NRI Monkey Man
 Sharlto Copley as American Monkey Man
 Sobhita Dhulipala as ???
 Sikandar Kher as Indian Monkey Man

Production
On October 29, 2018, it was reported that Dev Patel would make his directorial debut with an action thriller film titled Monkey Man. On March 12, 2021, it was announced that filming was completed and Netflix had bought worldwide rights to the film, described as "John Wick in Mumbai."

The film features fight choreography by Brahim Chab, an action actor and choreographer who has worked with Jackie Chan on the films Dragonblade and Vanguard, Scott Adkins on Ninja: Shadow of a Tear, Boyka:Undisputed and Abduction, Donnie Yen on Big Brother, Jean-Claude Van Damme on The Eagle Path and Pound of Flesh, and most recently Nicholas Tse on Customs Frontline.

References

External links
 

Upcoming films
American action thriller films
Bron Studios films
Films produced by Basil Iwanyk
Thunder Road Films films
Upcoming directorial debut films
Upcoming English-language films
Upcoming Netflix original films